Viktória Varga (born 17 April 1981, in Tatabánya) is a Hungarian female weightlifter, contesting in the +75 kg category and representing Hungary in numerous international competitions. A former world record holder in weightlifting, Varga also participated in the women's +75 kg division at the 2004 Summer Olympics.

Major results

References

1981 births
Living people
Hungarian female weightlifters
Weightlifters at the 2004 Summer Olympics
Olympic weightlifters of Hungary
People from Tatabánya
World record setters in weightlifting
Sportspeople from Komárom-Esztergom County
20th-century Hungarian women
21st-century Hungarian women